Exmagma are a three-piece German experimental jazz-rock and krautrock band who released two albums in the early 1970s. They  were formed in Stuttgart by Thomas Balluff, Andy Goldner, and Fred Braceful, who was a former member of jazz group Et Cetera. The first two albums Exmagma and Goldball were released in 1973 and 1974 respectively, while Exmagma 3 from 1975 was released in 2006. The band were included on the Nurse With Wound list.

Members
Andy Goldner (guitars, bass, sax, vocals)
Thomas Balluff (keyboards, trumpet, flute, vocals)
Fred Braceful (drums)

Discography
Exmagma (1973)
Goldball (1974)
Exmagma 3 (2006, recorded 1975)

References

German musical groups
German experimental rock groups